William Clements is a former American football player and coach. He served as the head football coach at Nicholls State University from 1974 to 1980.

Playing career
Clements is an alumnus of Tulane University where he played for the Green Wave from 1957 to 1959.

Coaching career

High School career
From 1962 to 1970, Clements was the  defensive coordinator at Holy Cross High School in New Orleans.

College career
During the 1971 season, Clements was defensive coordinator for the Nicholls State University club football team while it transitioned to varsity football. He continued in that role in 1972 and 1973 as part of the varsity coaching staff.

From 1974 to 1980, Clements served as head football coach at Nicholls State University compiling a record of 36 wins, 39 losses and 1 tie. In 1975, he guided Nicholls State to both its first winning season and conference championship in team history.

Head coaching record

References

Year of birth missing (living people)
Living people
High school football coaches in Louisiana
Nicholls Colonels football coaches
Tulane Green Wave football players